Yeovil railway station may refer to several railway stations in Yeovil, Somerset, England:
 Yeovil Pen Mill railway station, on the Heart of Wessex Line (from Bristol Temple Meads to Weymouth).
 The former Yeovil Town railway station, that closed on 1 March 1967.